Hermanos y hermanas is a Colombian telenovela produced by Vista Producciones for RCN Televisión, based on the American television series created by Jon Robin Baitz, titled Brothers & Sisters. It stars Verónica Orozco and Andrés Toro as the titular characters. It premiered on September 12, 2017, and concluded on January 10, 2018. In its first episode it obtained a total of 5.3 million viewers, becoming the sixth most watched program in Colombia and without being able to be a leader of audience in its schedule.

Cast 
 Verónica Orozco as Catalina Soto
 Patrick Delmas as Alejandro Villegas
 Luis Fernando Montoya as Guillermo Soto
 Estefanía Borge as Vicki
 Helena Mallarino as Nora Matiz
 Jimmy Vásquez as Carlos Villegas
 Juan Fernando Sánchez as Camilo Soto Matiz
 Marcela Agudelo as Sofía Vásquez
 Diego Pelaez as Manuel
 Katherine Vélez as Consuelo Álvarez
 Estefanía Godoy as Rebeca Soto Álvarez
 Alberto Pujol as Emilio Rubio
 José Restrepo as Lucas Soto Matiz
 Julián Orrego as Felipe Plomo Villegas
 Natasha Klauss as Sara Soto Matiz
 María Cristina Pimiento as Isabel
 Catalina Londoño as Elsa María
 Jairo Camargo as Saúl Matiz
 Andrés Toro as Tomás Soto Matiz
 Francisco Restrepo as Sebastián Duval Valencia
 Dylan Fuentes as Rodri Plomo
 Juan Pablo Puerta as Jeison
 Rodrigo Candamil as Juan Carlos Estrada

References 

2017 telenovelas
Colombian telenovelas
Spanish-language telenovelas
2017 Colombian television series debuts
RCN Televisión telenovelas
Colombian LGBT-related television shows
2018 Colombian television series endings
Colombian television series based on American television series
Television shows set in Colombia